This article is a partial list of journalists killed and missing during the Vietnam War. The press freedom organization Reporters Without Borders tallied 63 journalists who died over a 20-year period ending in 1975 while covering the Vietnam War with the caveat that media workers were not typically counted at the time.

List

See also
 List of United States servicemembers and civilians missing in action during the Vietnam War (1961–65)
 List of United States servicemembers and civilians missing in action during the Vietnam War (1966–67)
 List of United States servicemembers and civilians missing in action during the Vietnam War (1968–69)
 List of United States servicemembers and civilians missing in action during the Vietnam War (1970–71)
 List of United States servicemembers and civilians missing in action during the Vietnam War (1972–75)
 Vietnam War POW/MIA issue
 Joint POW/MIA Accounting Command
 Defense Prisoner of War/Missing Personnel Office

References

Vietnam War POW/MIA issues